The Peugeot Type 16 was a mid-size family car produced by French automaker Peugeot from 1897 to 1900.  The flat-twin engine was of the same series produced in the contemporaneous Peugeot Type 15, though the engine in the heavier Type 16 was enlarged to 2.4 L.  During the production run, the Type 16 (a 4-seater vis-à-vis) was joined in its class by the smaller Peugeot Type 17, the similar Type 19, and the larger Type 32.  A total of 87 Type 16s were built.

References
Peugeot Car Models 1889-1909
Histomobile- Peugeot Type 16

1890s cars
1900s cars
Type 16
Cars introduced in 1897